Robert Mitchell (19 May 1820 – 16 May 1873) was an English engraver, son of the engraver James Mitchell. He died at Bromley, Kent.

Works
Mitchell engraved in mezzotint Tapageur, a fashionable Member of the Canine Society, after Sir Edwin Landseer (1852) and The Parish Beauty (1853) and The Pastor's Pet, a pair after Alfred Rankley (1854). In the mixed style he engraved The Happy Mothers and The Startled Twins, a pair after Richard Ansdell, R.A. (1850), and Christ walking on the Sea, after Robert Scott Lauder (1854). Several of his etched plates were completed in mezzotint by other engravers.

Notes

Attribution

1820 births
1873 deaths
English engravers